Andre Mintze (born September 10, 1998) is an American football outside linebacker for the DC Defenders of the XFL. He played college football for the Vanderbilt Commodores.

College career
Mintze was a member of the Vanderbilt Commodores for five seasons, redshirting his true freshman season. He finished his collegiate career with 75 tackles, 17 tackles for loss, and 8.5 sacks with three forced fumbles and one fumble recovery in 43 games played.

Professional career

Denver Broncos
Mintze signed with the Denver Broncos as an undrafted free agent on May 1, 2021, shortly after the conclusion of the 2021 NFL Draft. He made the Broncos' 53-man roster out of training camp. He was placed on injured reserve on October 19, 2021 with a hamstring injury. He was activated on January 1, 2022. He was waived on May 12, 2022.

Minnesota Vikings
Mintze signed with the Minnesota Vikings on June 13, 2022. He was released on August 16, 2022.

DC Defenders 
On November 17, 2022, Mintze was drafted by the DC Defenders of the XFL.

References

External links
Vanderbilt Commodores bio
Denver Broncos bio

1998 births
Living people
American football linebackers
DC Defenders players
Denver Broncos players
Minnesota Vikings players
Vanderbilt Commodores football players
Players of American football from Pennsylvania